is a Japanese fencer. He competed in the individual sabre event at the 1992 Summer Olympics.

References

External links
 

1964 births
Living people
Japanese male sabre fencers
Olympic fencers of Japan
Fencers at the 1992 Summer Olympics
Sportspeople from Saitama Prefecture
Asian Games medalists in fencing
Fencers at the 1986 Asian Games
Fencers at the 1994 Asian Games
Asian Games bronze medalists for Japan
Medalists at the 1986 Asian Games
Medalists at the 1994 Asian Games
20th-century Japanese people
21st-century Japanese people